The Romance in E minor for violin and piano is a work by Edward Elgar composed in 1878 or 1879  and published in 1885 as his Opus 1.

The Romance was dedicated to Oswin Grainger, an older friend of Elgar's from a Worcester orchestra they played in, who was an amateur musician and grocer by trade.  It was published by Schott's in 1885 and the first performance was on 20 October, in Worcester.

Structure
Andante 12/8 E minor

Following the 4 bars of introduction by piano, violin shows the subject shown in excerpt 1.

Excerpt 1

Then, the same introduction by piano induces the exposure of excerpt 2, in G minor, played by violin.

Excerpt 2

The music reaches passionate climaxes twice before excerpt 1 reappears. Double stop of violin leads the quiet end of the work.

It is a short work, with performing time about 5 minutes.

Recordings
 Elgar: Romance for Violin & Piano, Op. 1, Simone Lamsma (Violin), Yurie Miura (Piano)
 Elgar: Romance for Violin & Piano, Op. 1, Marat Bisengaliev (Violin), Benjamin Frith (Piano)

Notes

References

 Score, Elgar: Romance pour Violon, Schott & Co., London, ca. 1885

External links
 
 Other Music for Piano and Violin on website from Elgar Society
 

Chamber music by Edward Elgar
Compositions in E minor